Wassef Ramez Medhat (born 10 August 1999) is an Egyptian professional footballer who plays as a forward for Wadi Degla.

Career statistics

Club

Notes

References

1999 births
Living people
Egyptian footballers
Egyptian expatriate footballers
Association football forwards
ENPPI SC players
Al Ahly SC players
Zamalek SC players
Al Mokawloon Al Arab SC players
Pyramids FC players
Wadi Degla SC players
Ergotelis F.C. players
Super League Greece 2 players
Egyptian expatriate sportspeople in Greece
Expatriate footballers in Greece